The Global Anglican Future Conference (GAFCON) is a series of conferences of conservative Anglican bishops and leaders, the first of which was held in Jerusalem from 22 to 29 June 2008 to address the growing controversy of the divisions in the Anglican Communion, the rise of secularism, as well as concerns with HIV/AIDS and poverty. As a result of the conference, the Jerusalem Declaration was issued and the Global Fellowship of Confessing Anglicans was created. The conference participants also called for the creation of the Anglican Church in North America as an alternative to both the Episcopal Church in the United States and the Anglican Church of Canada, and declared that recognition by the Archbishop of Canterbury is not necessary to Anglican identity.

GAFCON occurred one month prior to the Lambeth Conference, the ten-yearly gathering of Anglican Communion bishops. GAFCON stated the movement rose because a "false gospel" was being promoted within the Anglican Communion, which denied the uniqueness of Jesus Christ and "promotes a variety of sexual preferences and immoral behaviour as a universal human right". This is commonly considered a result of the consecration in 2003 of openly non-celibate homosexual bishop Gene Robinson by the Episcopal Church and more generally from the perception that some parts of the Anglican Communion might be departing from biblical teaching.

First conference (2008)

Conference

Originally GAFCON was intended to take place in two parts: a week in Jordan and a week in Jerusalem for the conference. This was also intended to allow participation by bishops from Pakistan and Sudan, who would not be able to visit Israel. To make accommodations and meet issues raised by the local Anglican Bishop in Jerusalem, the Jordan part of the programme was subsequently downgraded to a "pre-GAFCON preparatory consultation", with the Jerusalem segment upgraded from a pilgrimage to a period of substantive deliberation.

After one day, on June 18, Jordanian authorities closed GAFCON, forcing about 140 people to relocate to Jerusalem. Archbishop Akinola's diplomatic passport was denied entry into Jordan.

The conference took place from 22 to 29 June 2008 at the modern Renaissance Hotel near the outskirts of Jerusalem.

At the beginning of the conference a booklet was released by Archbishop Peter Akinola of Nigeria entitled The Way, the Truth and the Life: Theological Resources for a Pilgrimage to a Global Anglican Future. Delegates also visited sacred sites in and around Jerusalem.

Participants
The leading participants of GAFCON included seven Anglican primates, Archbishops Peter Akinola of Nigeria, Justice Akrofi of West Africa, Benjamin Nzimbi of Kenya, Emmanuel Kolini of Rwanda, Henry Luke Orombi of Uganda, Valentino Mokiwa of the Anglican Church of Tanzania, and Presiding Bishop Greg Venables of the Southern Cone; Archbishop Peter Jensen of Sydney, Australia, Bill Atwood of Kenya, Bishops Wallace Benn and Michael Nazir-Ali of England, Don Harvey of Canada, Bishops Robert Duncan and Martyn Minns of the United States; Canon Vinay Samuel of India, Hugh Pratt and Canon Chris Sugden of England. GAFCON was attended by 1148 lay and clergy delegates, including 291 Anglican Bishops, from 29 countries. The identities of those attending have not been published and may have included bishops and clergy outside the Anglican Communion, including some from the Continuing Anglican Movement. Hugh Pratt was also Treasurer, responsible for security, accommodation and the implementation of the Conference.

The leaders present claimed to represent 35 million "active" Anglicans in the worldwide communion. The leadership team listed by GAFCON on its website consisted of 16 men, of whom 9 were from England, North America and Australia, and one other was UK based.

Session topics

Daily sessions were held from 22 to 29 June 2008. Sessions were held on the topics of secularism, the Anglican Communion, HIV/AIDS and poverty.

Outcome
A GAFCON statement was released on the final day of the conference. It was produced based on input from all 1148 delegates.

The statement claimed that the GAFCON movement arose because a "false gospel" was being promoted within the Anglican Communion, which denied the uniqueness of Jesus Christ and "promotes a variety of sexual preferences and immoral behaviour as a universal human right".

The GAFCON statement announced that GAFCON would be a continuing "movement in the Spirit" rather than a once-off event. Although GAFCON did not decide to create a formal schism in the Anglican Communion, it expressed plans to set up new ecclesiastical structures, particularly within the liberal provinces of North America, to cater for conservative Anglicans. Of particular note, the GAFCON statement claims that recognition by the Archbishop of Canterbury is not necessary to Anglican identity. It calls for the formation of a new council of unelected GAFCON Primates.

The GAFCON statement was criticized by the Archbishop of Canterbury, Rowan Williams, who said that "A 'Primates' Council' which consists only of a self-selected group from among the Primates of the Communion will not pass the test of legitimacy for all in the Communion. And any claim to be free to operate across provincial boundaries is fraught with difficulties, both theological and practical."

Jerusalem Declaration
The GAFCON statement contained the "Jerusalem Declaration", a doctrinal confession which was intended to form the basis of a new "Global Fellowship of Confessing Anglicans" (FCA, now also branded as GAFCON). The declaration upheld the Holy Scriptures as containing "all things necessary for salvation", the first four Ecumenical councils and three Creeds as expressing the church's rule of faith, and the Thirty-Nine Articles as authoritative for Anglicans today. In addition, the 1662 Book of Common Prayer was called "a true and authoritative standard of worship and prayer" and the Anglican Ordinal was recognised as an authoritative standard.

Reactions

Archbishop of Canterbury
The Archbishop of Canterbury, Rowan Williams, said on 19 December 2007 that plans to hold a pre-Lambeth meeting for conservatives did not signal disloyalty as such a meeting "would not have any official status as far as the Communion is concerned".

Negative reactions

Bishop of Jerusalem
The Presiding Bishop of Jerusalem and the Middle East, Mouneer Anis, who is conservative on matters of human sexuality, publicly announced that he would not attend GAFCON, observing that "the Global South must not be driven by an exclusively Northern agenda or Northern personalities".

The Bishop of Jerusalem, Suheil Dawani, in whose territory it was to be held, initially issued a press release saying:

He indicated that the regional primate "is also concerned about this event. His advice to the organisers that this was not the right time or place for such a meeting was ignored."

On 12 and 15 January 2008, the Bishop of Jerusalem had meetings with the GAFCON organisers, including Archbishops Jensen and Akinola, in which he explained his reasons for objecting to the conference, and the damage it would do to his local ministry of welcome and reconciliation in the Holy Land. He insisted that the Lambeth Conference was the correct venue for internal discussions. However, he proposed as an alternative, "for the sake of making progress in this discussion" that the GAFCON conference should take place in Cyprus, to be followed by a "pure pilgrimage" to the Holy Land. The minutes of the meetings were published.

Conservatives
The announcement of the conference received criticism from some conservatives due to it potentially giving liberals a more powerful voice at the Lambeth Conference. Former archbishop of Canterbury, George Carey, said: "If the Jerusalem conference is an alternative to the Lambeth Conference, which I perceive it is, then I think it is regrettable. The irony is that all they are going to do is weaken the Lambeth Conference. They are going to give the liberals a more powerful voice because they are absent and they are going to act as if they are schismatics." Carey also called for the American House of Bishops to commit itself to the Windsor Covenant, which imposes a moratorium on the consecration of homosexual bishops and blessing of same-sex unions.

Liberals
The Bishop of Newcastle in Australia, Brian Farran, was critical of GAFCON along with the overwhelming majority of the Australian bishops.

Positive reactions
The conference was particularly welcomed by bishops in conflict with the official policies of the Episcopal Church of the United States of America. Former Episcopal priest, now suffragan bishop of the Convocation of Anglicans in North America, David Anderson said: "The gathering will be in the form of a pilgrimage back to the roots of the Church's faith: thus this journey begins with a pilgrimage."

Second conference (2013)
The second Global Anglican Future Conference was held in Nairobi, Kenya, from 21 October to 26 October 2013, at All Saints' Cathedral.

It was attended by 1358 delegates, 1003 clergy and 545 laity, from 38 countries. The number of bishops and archbishops in attendance was 331. The Primates who attended were Eliud Wabukala, of Kenya, Nicholas Okoh, of Nigeria, Stanley Ntagali, of Uganda, Onesphore Rwaje, of Rwanda, Bernard Ntahoturi, of Burundi, Henri Isingoma, of Congo, Daniel Deng Bul, of Sudan, Solomon Tilewa Johnson, of West Africa, Tito Zavala, of the Southern Cone, and Robert Duncan, of North America.

The focus was on the shared Anglican future, discussing the missionary theme of "Making Disciples of the Lord Jesus Christ".

Justin Welby, the Archbishop of Canterbury, made a flying visit to Nairobi on 20 October 2013, immediately ahead of the formal start (on 21 October 2013) of the full GAFCON event. During that flying visit, he met the GAFCON Primates who were holding a two-day pre-conference meeting.  He also expressed his condolences for the Westgate shopping mall attack and preached two sermons at All Saints' Cathedral.

Third conference (2018) 
The third Global Anglican Future Conference was held in Jerusalem, Israel, from 17 to 22 June 2018.

It was attended, according to their official numbers, by 1966 delegates, 1292 men and 670 women, from 53 countries, making it the largest international reunion of Anglicans since the Toronto Congress in 1963. These numbers include 993 clergy, among whom were 333 bishops, and 973 lay people.

The number of active and retired archbishops attending was 38, including seven current Primates of the Anglican Communion, Jackson Ole Sapit, of Kenya, Stanley Ntagali, of Uganda, Laurent Mbanda, of Rwanda, James Wong, of the Indian Ocean, Nicholas Okoh, of Nigeria, Stephen Than Myint Oo, of Myanmar, and Gregory Venables, of South America. Two GAFCON recognized Primates also attended: Foley Beach of North America, and Miguel Uchôa of Brazil. Primates Justin Badi Arama, of South Sudan, and Maimbo Mndolwa, of Tanzania, were not able to attend, despite being registered. Six retired Primates also attended, Peter Akinola, of Nigeria, Eliud Wabukala, of Kenya, Onesphore Rwaje, of Rwanda, Jacob Chimeledya, of Tanzania, Tito Zavala, of Anglican Church of South America, and Robert Duncan, of North America.

The largest single national delegation was from the Church of Nigeria, with 472 members. The number of Anglo-Catholics was smaller than in the two previous conferences.

At the conclusion of the conference, it was announced that in early 2019, Archbishop Foley Beach, Primate of the Anglican Church in North America, will succeed Archbishop Nicholas Okoh, Primate of the Church of Nigeria, as Chair of GAFCON's Primates Council; and Archbishop Benjamin Kwashi, former archbishop of Jos in Nigeria, will succeed Archbishop Peter Jensen, former archbishop of Sydney, as GAFCON's General Secretary.

G19 (2019) 
An additional conference, named G19, took place from 25 February to 1 March 2019, in Dubai, United Arab Emirates, for those who were not able to attend the previous year GAFCON III. G19 was hosted by bishops Michael Nazir-Ali, of the Church of England, and Azad Marshall, of the Church of Pakistan, and was attended by 138 delegates, including 31 bishops and archbishops, and four primates, Nicholas Okoh, of Nigeria, Foley Beach, of North America, both who also attended GAFCON III, Justin Badi Arama, of South Sudan, and Samuel Mankhin, of Bangladesh.

Ordination of women 
The ordination of women to holy orders, the offices of deacon, priest (presbyter), and bishop, remains controversial in GAFCON. In 2006, the Church of Nigeria planned to ordain women to the diaconate, but not as priests or bishops. In 2010, the church moved forward with those plans and began to ordain women as deacons, with limitations "for specific purposes like hospital work and school services". The Church of Nigeria continues to prohibit the ordination of women as priests or bishops. The Church of Uganda has ordained women as deacons since 1973 and as priests since 1983. The Anglican Church in North America allows each diocese to decide whether to ordain women as deacons or priests but does not permit the ordination of women as bishops. In 2018, the primatial bishops of the GAFCON member churches agreed to a moratorium on further ordinations of women to the episcopate. In 2016, prior to the moratorium, the Episcopal Church of Sudan consecrated the first woman, Elizabeth Awut Ngor, as bishop and the first among the GAFCON members. In 2021, the Anglican Church of Kenya consecrated two women as bishops, Emily Onyango was consecrated as an assisting bishop and Rose Okeno was consecrated as the diocesan bishop of the Diocese of Butere. In 2022, Archbishop Kaziimba of the Church of Uganda confirmed that a woman may be ordained a bishop in the Church of Uganda. In 2023, the Diocese of the Southern Cross welcomed its first female priest.

See also
Anglican Communion Network
Anglican Diocese of Sydney
Convocation of Anglicans in North America
Global Fellowship of Confessing Anglicans
Global South Anglican
Homosexuality and Anglicanism

References

External links
GAFCON website
GAFCON booklet*
http://gafcon.org/resources/jerusalem-statement/
All Video from speakers and presentations at Conference—GAFCON Jerusalem
Constructing the boundaries of Anglican orthodoxy: An analysis of the Global Anglican Future Conference (GAFCON) An article based on interviews and fieldwork conducted at GAFCON by the authors

Anglican realignment
2008 in Israel
2008 in Christianity
21st-century Protestantism
21st-century church councils
Protestant councils and synods